Axton is an unincorporated community in Henry County, Virginia, United States. Axton has a post office with ZIP code 24054, which opened on July 17, 1882. Axton Elementary School is located in Axton.

Notable people
J. C. Martin, baseball player

References

Unincorporated communities in Henry County, Virginia
Unincorporated communities in Virginia